Zinc finger E-box-binding homeobox 2 is a protein that in humans is encoded by the ZEB2 gene. The ZEB2 protein is a transcription factor that plays a role in the transforming growth factor β (TGFβ) signaling pathways that are essential during early fetal development.

Function 

ZEB2 (previously also known as SMADIP1, SIP1) and its mammalian paralog ZEB1 belongs to the Zeb family within the ZF (zinc finger) class of homeodomain transcription factors. ZEB2 protein has 8 zinc fingers and 1 homeodomain. The structure of the homeodomain shown on the right.

ZEB2 interacts with receptor-mediated, activated full-length SMADs. The activation of TGFβ receptors brings about the phosphorylation of intracellular effector molecules, R-SMADs. ZEB2 is an R-SMAD-binding protein and acts as a transcriptional corepressor. It is involved in the timing of the conversion of neuroepithelial cells into radial glial cells in early development, a mechanism thought to allow for the large differences in brain size between humans and other mammals.

ZEB2 transcripts are found in tissues differentiated from the neural crest such as the cranial nerve ganglia, dorsal root ganglia, sympathetic ganglionic chains, the enteric nervous system and melanocytes. ZEB2 is also found in tissues that are not derived from the neural crest, including the wall of the digestive tract, kidneys, and skeletal muscles.

Clinical significance 

Mutations in the ZEB2 gene are associated with the Mowat–Wilson syndrome. This disease exhibits mutations and even complete deletions of the ZEB2 gene. Mutations of the gene can cause the gene to produce nonfunctional ZEB2 proteins or inactivate the function gene as a whole. These deficits of ZEB2 protein interfere with the development of many organs. Many of the symptoms can be explained by the irregular development of the structures from the neural crest.

Hirschsprung's disease also has many symptoms that can be explained by lack of ZEB2 during development of the digestive tract nerves. This disease causes severe constipation and enlargement of the colon.

References

Further reading

External links 
  GeneReviews/NIH/NCBI/UW entry on Mowat-Wilson syndrome
 

Transcription factors